Aamir Zaki (April 8, 1968 – June 2, 2017) was a Saudi born Pakistani guitarist-songwriter and composer. Zaki is widely considered by many as one of the most influential guitarists in Pakistan's history, and is considered to be among the pioneers of rock music in Pakistan.

Career
Zaki started out his music career with a band named The Scratch in 1987. Their first album was entitled The Bomb, with the title track being about the Empress Market bomb blast. He later quit The Scratch in 1988 to form his own band.

On Tour with Alamgir
The first mainstream musician to recognise Zaki as a teenage prodigy was Alamgir, who got in touch with him to tour India, Dubai, England and the United States. After touring, Zaki played on two of Alamgir's albums. "Keh De Na" and "Albela Rahi" were two singles with Zaki as the lead guitarist.

Post-Alamgir
After parting with Alamgir, Aamir Zaki formed the rock band Axe Attack. Axe Attack's debut album was rejected by Pakistani record labels, causing the group to fall out. Some years later, the rhythm guitarist Nadeem Ishtiaq took the album to Australia where the songs made it to the radio and were well received.

Vital Signs
In 1994, Zaki joined Vital Signs who at that time were already country's largest pop act. Vital Signs had expelled their second guitarist Rizwan-ul-Haq, and Zaki joined in his place. Zaki performed extensively with Vital Signs before quitting the band due to not getting a fair split in royalties. Zaki later toured with former bandmates Junaid Jamshed and Shahzad Hassan after Hyatt's exit from the band.

Solo career
After leaving Vital Signs, Zaki released Signature in 1995, an independent release, by his own money. The first batch of CDs was made in England, and Sonic released the album in Pakistan. The album was a hit, and one song "Mera Pyar" (Urdu for My Love) was a major hit, when asked about inspiration for the song, Zaki responded by saying, "someone who doesn't exist and never will.", referencing to his ex-wife. Zaki was awarded with the Gold Disc for his debut album from Soundcraft UK. Zaki further released two more albums Rough Cut (2007) with Hadiqa Kiani on vocals and Radio Star (2007).

In the late 1990s, Zaki started to perform live songs of his original English and Urdu tracks. He also started doings gigs at Karajazz Festival and Cafe Blue (Karachi, Pakistan).

Zaki further collaborated with many artists on various tracks including collaborations with Hadiqa Kiani for her song "Is Baar Milo" and with Maha Ali Kazmi for song "Aaj Sun Ke Tumara Naam" which was released on his one-month death anniversary.

Coke Studio
Zaki appeared as a guest musician on Coke Studio Pakistan (season 7). He featured on four songs by Zoheb Hassan, "Chehra", "Dheeray Dheeray" "Jaana", and "Sab Aakho Ali Ali". Then he last featured in Coke Studio Pakistan (season 10) in only one song by Javed Bashir and Akbar Ali "Naina Moray".

Personal life
Zaki got married at the age of 22, and got divorced at the age of 24. The song "Mera Pyar" from his album Signature was for his ex-wife. Zaki had prolonged illness and severe depression, he became self-destructive over time and even started to burn some of his guitars.

Death
Zaki died on June 2, 2017, at the age of 49 after suffering from a heart attack.

Discography

Solo  career
Signature (1995)
Rough Cut (2007)

Vital Signs
Hum Tum

References

1968 births
2017 deaths
Pakistani guitarists
Pakistani male singers
Pakistani heavy metal guitarists